Newton Township is one of the twelve townships of Miami County, Ohio, United States.  The 2000 census found 3,354 people in the township, 2,220 of whom lived in the unincorporated portions of the township.

Geography
Located in the western part of the county, it borders the following townships:
Newberry Township - north
Washington Township - northeast
Concord Township - east
Union Township - south
Monroe Township, Darke County - southwest corner
Franklin Township, Darke County - west
Adams Township, Darke County - northwest corner

The village of Pleasant Hill is located in central Newton Township.

Name and history
One of five Newton Townships statewide, it was named for British scientist Isaac Newton.

Government
The township is governed by a three-member board of trustees, who are elected in November of odd-numbered years to a four-year term beginning on the following January 1. Two are elected in the year after the presidential election and one is elected in the year before it. There is also an elected township fiscal officer, who serves a four-year term beginning on April 1 of the year after the election, which is held in November of the year before the presidential election. Vacancies in the fiscal officership or on the board of trustees are filled by the remaining trustees.

References

External links
County website

Townships in Miami County, Ohio
Townships in Ohio